Poltakov (Poltakov; Khakas: , Poltax) is a village (a selo) in the Askizsky District of the Republic of Khakassia, Russia. It is located on the northern side of Mount Pistag, the Es' River flows along the village. Population:

History
The village was formed by the merger of several aals - Poltakh, Tirenchin, Khubachakov, and Ust-Teya - at the beginning of the 20th century. The Khakas name of the village, Poltakh, came from Todinov Poltakh, a rich cattle merchant.

Demographics
The village of Poltakov is made up of Khakas people forming the majority at 88% and Russian people forming a minority at 12%

References

Rural localities in Khakassia
Cities and towns in Khakassia